Koğuk can refer to:

 Koğuk, Bismil
 Koğuk, Karpuzlu